Lipgloss was a Philippine television series broadcast by TV5. It premiered on August 16, 2008.

The series was tagged as a Philippine adaptation of the popular American TV series, Gossip Girl.

The show's first season had its finale on November 8, 2008. Season 2 immediately premiered on November 15, 2008. Season 3 premiered on February 14, 2009. Season 4, the final season, ended on August 29, 2009.

The show's theme song was very similar to – and was directly inspired by – the song "Lip Gloss" by Lil Mama.

Story
Lipgloss was a teenage drama series, following the lives of the rich and infamous students of the ultra-exclusive Linden High, through the school's unofficial website.

Plot

Season 1
Season 1 kicks off with best friends Abby and Meg competing for Jake. He is in love with Meg, but is dating Abby. Jake chooses Meg and ends his relationship with Abby.

The whole cast is introduced. Julivee is new in Linden and becomes best friends with Louise, who is a popular ice skater. They then meet siblings Ziggy and Edge Borja. Steph is introduced as the meanest girl in school. Maui is Jake's friend. Jiggo is Jake's half-brother. Ziggy gets hit by a car and dies. Kyle mourns over her death. We learn that Kyle is the administrator of the site Lipgloss. Kyle is never to be seen again in the series.

Season 2
Season Two is filled with love-related conflicts. Jake and Abby are together again, but their parents don't approve so they decide to live on their own. Meg and Edge break up because Sarah, Edge's ex-girlfriend returns to woo him back. Meg finds a new boyfriend in actor Nikko Lopez. Julivee develops a crush on Caloy, their driver's son. Caloy's best friend, Poknat, joins in on the fun and provides comic relief. Jose Mari is introduced as Julivee's would-be husband. However, Jose Mari turns out to be gay and gets closer with Caloy instead. Louise gets into a relationship with her middle-aged school professor, Mr. Aldrich Quinto.

Season 3
Abby and Jake break up because of Jake's boss Camille who steals him from her. Meg to the hands of his bodyguard Santi, who develops feelings for her. Maui falls for Carla who is also courted by Poknat. Louise and Aldrich break up because Aldrich returns to his ex-fiancée Rose. Introducing in the mid-season is Camille and Rose's brother Brent who wants Louise. Meanwhile, it is Edge and Louise who end up together. Julivee meets Brazilian Patrice whom they use to make Jose Mari a boy again.

A devastating accident kills two main characters — Maui and Meg.

Season 4
The fourth and final season shows the senior year of the students at Linden, including repeater Abby Rickson, who has finally moved on from Jake and Camille. Brent starts courting Louise, but finds competition in his long-time best friend, Chip, to whom he owes a big debt. Julivee gets jealous over Janna, a girl who Caloy meets. Carla tries to move on from Maui. Edge meets a beautiful princess, Ava, whom he falls for.

The finale shows the love teams ending up with each other: Abby and Jake, Louise and Brent, Ava and Edge.

Cast

Original cast
 Maxene Eigenmann as Abby Rickson
 Saab Magalona as Meg Magdrigal
 Rodjun Cruz as Jake Perez
 Mikee Lee as Maui Amor / Bentong
 Fred Payawan as Jiggo Perez
 Sam Concepcion as Kyle Ponce
 Kevin Jose Lapena as Edge Borja
 Cheska Ortega as Ziggy Borja
 Louise delos Reyes as Louise Tangco
 Czarina Suzara as Julivee
 Miki Hahn as Stephanie "Steph" Garces
 Princess Ryan as Sarah Madison

Season 2 additions
 Neil Coleta as Caloy Borongan
 Jessa Joy Mendoza as Carla Borongan
 Carl Guevarra as Jose Mari Bonifacio
 Zyrus Dezamparado as Poknat

Season 3 additions
 Niña Jose as Camille Borromeo
 Nico Ibaviosa as Brent Borromeo
 Ejay Falcon as Santi

Season 4 additions
 Lovi Poe as Princess Ava
 Regine Angeles as Charlene Rickson
 Cherry Ann Kubota as Allona Rickson
 Enz Guazon as Chip Ledesma
 Benj Besa as Knoxx
 Rhen Escaño as Jana

Extended cast
 Christian Vasquez as Aldrich Quintos
 Rachel Lobangco as Abby's mom
 Ricardo Cepeda as Congressman Perez
 Debraliz as Julie (Julivee's mom)
 Lloyd Samartino as Meg's dad
 Daiana Menezes as Patrice
 Miguel de las Cagigas as Prince Drew
 Lorenzo Mara as Edge's dad
 Lian Paz as Rose Borromeo
 Emilio Garcia
 Macy Garcia

Guests
 Paolo Paraiso as Alex
 Joross Gamboa as Thirdy
 Matt Evans as Nikko Lopez
 Megan Young as Jenny Samson
 Janina San Miguel as Buding
 Angelica Jones as Mimi
 Marco Alcaraz as Frank
 Matutina as Lola Biring
 Jana Roxas as Kelly
 Rosanna Roces as Princess Arabelle/Mommy A.
 Wanlu as Talentadong Pinoy judge
 Beatriz Saw as Mayumi Castro
 Sugar Mercado as Rosanna
 Marco Morales as Kikoy
 Josef Elizalde as Prince Ali
 Nicole Uysiuseng as Sheila
 JB Magsaysay as Joel
 Olyn Membian as Liza
 Katarina Perez as Sheena

Criticism
Lipgloss closely resembled the hit American TV show Gossip Girl, prompting people to label it as a rip-off of the iconic series. Many said that the show's plot imitated that of Gossip Girl — Gossip Girl spread the gossip about the main characters, the website administrator does the same in Lipgloss.

Trivia
In the middle of the second season, Sam Concepcion and Cheska Ortega left the show. Matt Evans and Carlo Guevara were then added to the cast.

Lovi Poe's contract with her home network, GMA Network, initially did not allow her to become part of Lipgloss. An exception was made and she appeared in the show's final season. Aside from Lipgloss, TV5 offered Poe to star in the remake of Cofradia. This project did not push through.

Pinoy Big Brother: Teen Edition Plus housemates Robi Domingo, Ejay Falcon, and Josef Elizalde were all considered to join in Season 4 of Lipgloss. However, because of Domingo's schedule with MYX and his other commitments with ABS-CBN, only Falcon and Elizalde made it to the show.

This was Czarina Suzara's first TV appearance — the second being the 2012 version of Valiente.

Awards
Winner, Best Youth Oriented Program — 2010 PMPC Star Awards for TV
Nominated, Best Youth Oriented Program — 2008-2009 PMPC Star Awards for TV

References

See also
List of programs aired by TV5

TV5 (Philippine TV network) original programming
2008 Philippine television series debuts
2009 Philippine television series endings
Philippine teen drama television series
Filipino-language television shows
Television series about teenagers